Jean-Yves Le Déaut (born 1 February 1945 in Guémené-sur-Scorff) is a member of the National Assembly of France.  He represents the Meurthe-et-Moselle department,  and is a member of the Socialiste, radical, citoyen et divers gauche.

References

1945 births
Living people
People from Guémené-sur-Scorff
Socialist Party (France) politicians
Deputies of the 12th National Assembly of the French Fifth Republic
Deputies of the 13th National Assembly of the French Fifth Republic
Deputies of the 14th National Assembly of the French Fifth Republic